Lacandon may refer to:
the Lacandon people, one of the contemporary Maya peoples
the Lakandon Ch'ol, a historic Maya people
the Lacandon language, the language spoken by the contemporary Lacandon people
the Lacandon Jungle, a Mexican region

See also 
 Lacandonia, a genus of plants
 Lacantunia, a genus of catfish
 Lacantún River, in Mexico
 Laocoon (disambiguation)